Heat Lightning Rumbles in the Distance is the third solo album by Drive-By Truckers frontman Patterson Hood, released on September 11, 2012 on ATO Records.

Background and recording
Heat Lightning Rumbles in the Distance is based on a novel Hood started writing but never finished. The novel was based on a very difficult time in Hood's life in the early 1990s. Hood wrote the novel while on the road touring in support of The Big To-Do.

Critical reception

On review aggregator website Metacritic, the album has a score of 77 out of 100, based on 13 reviews, corresponding to "generally favorable reviews".

Track listing
12:01
Leaving Time
Disappear
Better Off Without
(untold pretties)
After The Damage
Better Than The Truth
Betty Ford
Depression Era
Heat Lightning Rumbles in the Distance
Come Back Little Star
Fifteen Days (Leaving Time Again)

Personnel
David Barbe – bass, electric bass, engineer, mixing, producer, shaker
Greg Calbi – mastering
Mike Cooley – banjo
Scott Danbom – cello, fiddle, piano, violin
Matt DeFilippis – live sound engineer, road manager
Wes Freed – artwork, illustrations
Phoebe Gellman – additional production
Jay Gonzalez – accordion, mellotron, piano, piano (grand), piano (upright), Wurlitzer electric piano
Tim Hall – additional production
Kelly Hogan – vocal harmony, vocals
David Hood – bass
Lilla Hood – art direction
Patterson Hood	– guitars, mandocello, monologue, photography, producer, vocal harmony, vocals, background vocals
Rebecca Hood – cover photo, photography
Will Johnson – atmosphere, electric guitar, vocal harmony
Andy LeMaster – engineer
Brad Morgan – drums, percussion, pipe snare drum, tambourine
Jacob Morris – cello, violin
John Neff – pedal steel guitar
Steve Rainbow – additional production
Jon Salter – additional production
Edwin Schroter – additional production
Traci Thomas – publicity
Drew Vandenberg – engineer

References

Patterson Hood albums
2012 albums
ATO Records albums